Sambongsan may refer to:

 Sambongsan (South Geongsang/South Jeolla), a mountain in South Korea
 Sambongsan (Chungcheongbuk-do), a mountain in South Korea
 Sambongsan (Geochang), a mountain in South Korea